Angela Chan Ka-yan is a Hong Kong rugby union player. She debuted for Hong Kong against Japan in the first match of the 2016 Asia Rugby Women's Championship. She then featured for Hong Kong in a test match against Singapore the following week which was not part of the championship. Chan also played in the second match of the Asia Women's Championship.

Chan has a Master of Social Science degree in Psychology from the University of Hong Kong. She was named in the training squad for the 2017 Women's Rugby World Cup qualifiers against Fiji and Japan in November 2016. Chan was selected for Hong Kong's squad in their first Rugby World Cup appearance in 2017.

In 2018, she made Hong Kong's squad for their tour of Spain and Wales. She started in the first of two matches against Spain.

References 

Living people
Hong Kong people
Hong Kong rugby union players
Hong Kong female rugby union players
Year of birth missing (living people)